Frank Luckel (May 18, 1888 – December 14, 1974) served in the California State Assembly for the 78th district from 1947 to 1963 and during both World War I and World War II he served in the United States Navy.

References

United States Navy personnel of World War I
United States Navy personnel of World War II
Republican Party members of the California State Assembly
20th-century American politicians
1888 births
1974 deaths